The American Cup is an annual invitational double-elimination chess tournament in St. Louis, Missouri, United States.

Format
The tournament is 8 player double elimination tournament, featuring 8 of the strongest players in the United States. The championship bracket is played with a time control of 90 minutes, with a 30 second increment throughout for 2 games. The elimination bracket is played with a time control of 25 minutes and a 10 second increment for 2 games. If needed two tiebreak games of 10 minutes with a 5 second increment are played followed by an Armageddon game if necessary. The 2023 edition had 2 blitz games after the initial 10 minute rapid games if still tied before going to Armageddon.

Tournament

2022 Bracket
The inaugural edition was held from April 20–28, 2022. Levon Aronian, Fabiano Caruana, Lenier Dominguez, Wesley So, Sam Shankland, Sam Sevian, Jeffery Xiong, and Ray Robson participated in the inaugural event. The tournament was won by Fabiano Caruana.

2023 Bracket
The 2nd edition of the tournament is being held from March 17th-March 26th.  Hikaru Nakamura, Fabiano Caruana, Wesley So, Levon Aronian, Lenier Dominguez, Sam Shankland, and Ray Robson participated in this edition.

Women's American Cup
Running simultaneously with the main tournament a women's tournament is held, featuring 8 of the strongest women in the United States.

2022 Women's Tournament Bracket

Irina Krush, Anna Zatonskih, Stavroula Tsolakidou, Gulrukhbegim Tokhirjonova, Katerina Nemcova, Alice Lee, Tatev Abrahamyan, and Ruiyang Yan. The inaugural Women's tournament was won by Irina Krush. 12-year-old Alice Lee finished as the runner-up.

2023 Women's Tournament Bracket
The women's field for the 2023 edition includes Irina Krush, Alice Lee, Anna Zatonskih, Gulrukhbegim Tokhirjonova, Katerina Nemcova, Nazi Paikidze, Atousa Pourkashiyan, and Tatev Abrahamyan.

References

2022 in chess
Chess competitions
Chess in the United States
Events in St. Louis
Recurring sporting events established in 2022